Žarko Udovičić (Serbian Cyrillic: Жарко Удовичић; born 31 August 1987) is a Serbian professional footballer who mainly plays as a left winger.

Career 
Udovičić previously played for Morava Katrga, Sloboda Užice and Mladost Lučani. In February 2015 he was threatened at gunpoint by a group of Novi Pazar fans after missing a penalty against FK Rad.

Honours
Napredak
Serbian First League: 2012–13

Lechia Gdańsk
Polish Super Cup: 2019

Raków Częstochowa
Polish Cup: 2021–22

References

External links
 
 Profile on FK Napredak official website
 
 
 Stats at Utakmica.rs

1987 births
Living people
Sportspeople from Užice
Serbian footballers
Association football defenders
Association football wingers
FK Sloboda Užice players
FK Mladost Lučani players
FK Napredak Kruševac players
FK Novi Pazar players
Zagłębie Sosnowiec players
Lechia Gdańsk players
Raków Częstochowa players
Ekstraklasa players
I liga players	
Serbian SuperLiga players
Serbian expatriate footballers
Serbian expatriate sportspeople in Poland
Expatriate footballers in Poland